Penny Black may refer to:
 The Penny Black, the world's first official adhesive postage stamp
 Penny Black (album), by Further Seems Forever
 Penny Black (film), directed by Joe Hitchcock
 Penny Black (research project), a Microsoft Research project on fighting spam
 Penny Black, a 1984 crime novel by Susan Moody
 Penny Black, a fictional character appearing in DC Comics' Flashpoint story arc